Natica castrensis is a species of predatory sea snail, a marine gastropod mollusk in the family Naticidae, the moon snails.

Description

Distribution
Barbados, Lesser Antilles. Known from hermit-crabbed shells, in deep-water traps set at 150-200 metres.

References

Naticidae
Gastropods described in 1889